Liu Xianshi (May 8, 1870 – October 14, 1927) was a Chinese general of the Late Qing dynasty and early Republican period. Initially supporting Yuan Shikai and his declaration of the Empire of China, Liu joined Cai E and Tang Jiyao a month after the start of the National Protection War in rebelling against Yuan.

1870 births
1927 deaths
Republic of China warlords from Guizhou
Qing dynasty generals
People from Qianxinan
Empire of China (1915–1916)